Cloud Atlas is the third novel by British author David Mitchell. Published in 2004, it won the British Book Awards Literary Fiction award and the Richard & Judy Book of the Year award. It was short-listed for the Booker Prize, Nebula Award for Best Novel, and Arthur C. Clarke Award, among other accolades. Unusually, it received awards from both the general literary community and the speculative fiction community. A film adaptation directed by the Wachowskis and Tom Tykwer, and featuring an ensemble cast, was released in 2012.

The book combines metafiction, historical fiction, contemporary fiction and science fiction, with interconnected nested stories that take the reader from the remote South Pacific in the 19th century to the island of Hawai'i in a distant post-apocalyptic future. Its title was inspired by the piece of music of the same name by Japanese composer Toshi Ichiyanagi. The author has said that the book is about reincarnation and the universality of human nature, and that the title refers to a changing landscape (a "cloud") over manifestations of fixed human nature (the "atlas"). It is not a direct reference to a cloud atlas.

Plot summary
The book consists of six nested stories; each is read or observed by a main character of the next, progressing in time through the central sixth story. The first five stories are each interrupted at a pivotal moment. After the sixth story, the others are resolved in reverse chronological order. Each section's protagonist reads or observes the chronologically earlier work in the chain.

The Pacific Journal of Adam Ewing (Part 1)
The first story begins in the Chatham Islands near New Zealand in the mid-nineteenth century, where Adam Ewing, a guileless American lawyer from San Francisco during the California Gold Rush, awaits repairs to his ship. He witnesses a Moriori slave being flogged by a Maori overseer. During the punishment, the victim, Autua, sees pity in Ewing's eyes and smiles. Later, Ewing ascends a high hill called Conical Tor and stumbles into its crater, where he finds himself surrounded by faces carved into trees. Reasoning that those who carved the faces must have had egress from the crater, he escapes. As the ship gets underway, Dr. Goose, Ewing's only friend aboard the ship, examines the injuries sustained on the volcano, and Ewing also mentions his chronic ailment. The doctor diagnoses Ewing with fatal parasite infection and recommends a course of treatment. Meanwhile, Autua has stowed away in Ewing's cabin. When Ewing discloses this to the Captain, Autua proves himself a first-class seaman, and the Captain puts Autua to work for his passage to Hawaii.

Letters from Zedelghem (Part 1)
The next story is set in Zedelghem, near Bruges, Belgium, in 1931. It is told in the form of letters from Robert Frobisher, a recently disowned and penniless bisexual young English musician, to his lover Rufus Sixsmith, after Frobisher journeys to Zedelghem to become an amanuensis to the reclusive once-great composer Vyvyan Ayrs, who is dying of syphilis and nearly blind. Soon, Frobisher produces Der Todtenvogel ("The Death Bird") from a basic melody that Ayrs gives him. It is performed nightly in Kraków, and Ayrs is much praised. Frobisher takes pride in this and begins composing his own music again. Frobisher and Ayrs' wife Jocasta become lovers, but her daughter Eva remains suspicious of him. Frobisher sells rare books from Ayrs' collection to a fence, but is intrigued by reading the first half of The Pacific Journal of Adam Ewing, and asks Sixsmith if he can obtain the second half so Frobisher can learn how the story ends. Ayrs asks Frobisher to write a song inspired by a dream of a "nightmarish cafe", deep underground, wherein "the waitresses all had the same face" and ate soap. As the summer comes to an end, Jocasta thanks Frobisher for "giving Vyvyan his music back", and Frobisher agrees to stay until the next summer.

Half-Lives: The First Luisa Rey Mystery (Part 1)
The third story is written in the style of a mystery/thriller novel, set in the fictional city of Buenas Yerbas, California, in 1975, with protagonist Luisa Rey, a young journalist. She meets the elderly Rufus Sixsmith in a stalled elevator, and she tells him about her late father, one of the few incorruptible policemen in the city, who became a famous war correspondent. Later, after Sixsmith tells Luisa his concern that the Seaboard HYDRA nuclear power plant is not safe, he is found dead of apparent suicide. Luisa believes the businessmen in charge of the plant are assassinating potential whistleblowers. From Sixsmith's hotel room, Luisa acquires some of Frobisher's letters. Another plant employee, Isaac Sachs, gives her a copy of Sixsmith's report. Before Luisa can report her findings on the nuclear power plant, a Seaboard-hired assassin who has been following her forces her car—along with Sixsmith's incriminating report—off a bridge.

The Ghastly Ordeal of Timothy Cavendish (Part 1)
The fourth story, comic in tone, is set in Britain in the present day; Timothy Cavendish, a 65-year-old vanity press publisher, flees the brothers of his gangster client, whose book is experiencing high sales after the murder of a book critic. They threaten Cavendish with violence if their monetary demands are not met. Cavendish's wealthy brother, exasperated by Cavendish's frequent previous pleas for financial aid, books him into a menacing nursing home. Timothy signs custody papers, thinking that he is registering at a hotel where he can stay until his personal and financial problems can be solved. When he realizes he will be held there indefinitely, subject to the staff's complete control, he tries to flee but is stopped by a security guard and confined. He briefly mentions reading a manuscript titled Half-Lives: The First Luisa Rey Mystery, but is not initially impressed by the prospective author's manuscript and only comes to appreciate it later. He settles into his new surroundings while still trying to plot a way out. One day, he has a stroke, and the chapter ends.

An Orison of Sonmi~451 (Part 1)
The fifth story is set in Nea So Copros, a dystopian futuristic state in Korea, derived from corporate culture. It is told in the form of an interview of Sonmi~451, after her arrest and trial, by an "archivist" who records Sonmi~451's story into a silver egg-shaped device. Sonmi~451 is a fabricant waitress at a fast-food restaurant called Papa Song's. Clones grown in vats are revealed to be the predominant source of cheap labor. The "pureblood" (natural-born) society retards the fabricants' consciousness by chemical manipulation, using a food Sonmi refers to as "Soap". After twelve years as slaves, fabricants are promised retirement to a fabricant community in Honolulu. In her own narration, Sonmi encounters members of a university faculty and students, who take her from the restaurant for study and assist her to become self-aware, or "ascended". She describes watching The Ghastly Ordeal of Timothy Cavendish as a pre-Skirmishes film (wherein the "Skirmishes" are a major global disaster or war that destroyed most of the world except Nea So Copros). During the scene in which Cavendish suffers his stroke, a student interrupts to tell Sonmi and her rescuer Hae-Joo Im that Professor Mephi, Hae-Joo's professor, has been arrested, and that policy enforcers have orders to interrogate Hae-Joo and kill Sonmi on sight.

Sloosha's Crossin' an' Evrythin' After
The sixth story occupies the central position in the novel and is the only one not interrupted, wherein Zachry, an old man, tells a story from his youth, speaking an imagined future English dialect. It is gradually revealed that he lived in a post-apocalyptic society on the Big Island of Hawaii. His people, called the Valley Folk, are peaceful farmers but are often raided by the Kona tribe of cannibalistic slavers. Zachry is plagued by moral doubts stemming from blaming himself for his father's death and the kidnapping of his brother years prior. His people worship a goddess called Sonmi and recall a 'Fall' in which the civilized peoples of Earth—known as the Old Uns—were destroyed, leaving the survivors to primitivism. Big Island is occasionally visited and studied by a technologically sophisticated people known as the Prescients, whereof a woman called Meronym, who has come to learn their ways, is assigned to live with Zachry's family. Zachry becomes suspicious of her, believing that her people are gaining their trust before doing them harm. He sneaks into her room, where he finds an 'orison', an egg-shaped device for recording and holographic videoconferencing. Later, Zachry's sister Catkin is poisoned by a scorpion fish, and he persuades Meronym to break her people's rules and give him medicine to heal Catkin. When Meronym later requests a guide to the top of Mauna Kea volcano, Zachry reluctantly agrees, citing his debt to her for saving his sister. They climb to the ruins of the Mauna Kea Observatories, where Meronym explains the orison and reveals Sonmi's history (as introduced in the prior chapter). Upon their return, they go with most of the Valley Folk to trade at Honokaa, but Zachry's people are attacked and imprisoned by the Kona, who are conquering the territory. Zachry and Meronym eventually escape, and she takes him to a safer island. The story ends with Zachry's child recalling that his father told many unbelievable tales, but that this one may be true because he has inherited Zachry's copy of Sonmi's orison, which Zachry's child often watches, even though he does not understand Sonmi's language.

An Orison of Sonmi~451 (Part 2)
Hae-Joo Im reveals that he and Mephi are members of an anti-government rebel movement called Union. Hae-Joo then guides Sonmi in disguise to a ship, where Sonmi witnesses retired fabricants butchered and recycled into Soap, the fabricant food source. Any leftover "reclaimed proteins" from the butchered fabricants are used to produce food that purebloods unknowingly consume at fast-food type restaurants. The rebels plan to raise all fabricants to self-awareness and thus disrupt the workforce that keeps the corporate government in power. They want Sonmi to write a series of abolitionist Declarations calling for rebellion. She does, echoing the themes of greed and oppression first brought up in the diary of Adam Ewing.

Sonmi is then arrested in an elaborately filmed government raid and finds herself telling her tale to the archivist. Sonmi believes that everything that happened to her was instigated by the government to encourage the fear and hatred of fabricants by purebloods. Sonmi's last wish is to finish watching Cavendish's story.

The Ghastly Ordeal of Timothy Cavendish (Part 2)
Having mostly recovered from his mild stroke, Cavendish meets a small group of residents also anxious to escape the nursing home: Ernie, Veronica, and the extremely senile Mr. Meeks. Cavendish assists the other residents' conspiracy to trick a fellow patient's grown son, Johns Hotchkiss, into leaving Hotchkiss' car vulnerable to theft. The residents seize the car and escape, stopping at a pub to celebrate their freedom. They are nearly recaptured by Hotchkiss and the staff, but are rescued when Mr. Meeks, in an unprecedented moment of lucidity, exhorts the local drinkers to come to their aid.

It is thereafter revealed that Cavendish's secretary Mrs. Latham blackmailed the gangsters with a video record of their attack upon Cavendish's office; this allows Cavendish to return to his former life in safety. Subsequently, Cavendish obtains the second half of Luisa Rey's story intending to publish it, and he considers having his own recent adventures turned into a film script.

Half-Lives: The First Luisa Rey Mystery (Part 2)
Rey escapes from her sinking car but loses the report, while a plane carrying Isaac is blown up. When her newspaper is bought by a subsidiary of Seaboard, she is fired, and Luisa believes that they no longer see her as a threat. She orders a copy of Robert Frobisher's obscure Cloud Atlas Sextet, which she has read about in his letters to Rufus Sixsmith, and is astonished to find that she recognizes it, even though it is a rarely published piece. However, Smoke the assassin still pursues Luisa and booby-traps a copy of Rufus Sixsmith's report about the power plant. Joe Napier, a security man who knew Luisa's father, and whom Luisa initially believed to be her attempted assassin, comes to her rescue, and Smoke and Napier kill each other in a gun fight. Later, Rey exposes the corrupt corporate leaders to the public. At the end of the story, she receives a package from Sixsmith's niece, which contains the remaining eight letters from Robert Frobisher to Rufus Sixsmith.

Letters from Zedelghem (Part 2)
Frobisher continues to pursue his work with Ayrs while developing his own Cloud Atlas Sextet. He finds himself falling in love with Eva, after she confesses a crush on him, though he is still having an affair with her mother. Jocasta suspects this and threatens to destroy his life if he so much as looks at her daughter. Ayrs also becomes bolder with his plagiarism of Frobisher, now demanding he compose full passages, which Ayrs intends to take credit for. Ayrs also informs him that if he leaves, Ayrs will have him blacklisted claiming he raped Jocasta. In despair, Frobisher leaves anyway, but finds a hotel nearby working to finish his Sextet and hoping to be reunited with Eva. He convinces himself that they are being kept apart from her parents, but when he finally manages to talk to her he realizes that the man she was talking about being in love with was her Swiss fiancé. Mentally and physically ill Frobisher ultimately decides, with his magnum opus finished and his life now empty of meaning, to kill himself. Before committing suicide in a bathtub, he writes one last letter to Sixsmith and includes his Sextet and The Pacific Journal of Adam Ewing.

The Pacific Journal of Adam Ewing (Part 2)
Ewing visits the island of Raiatea, where he observes missionaries oppressing the indigenous peoples. On the ship, he falls further ill and realizes at the last minute that Dr. Goose is poisoning him to steal his possessions. He is rescued by Autua and resolves to join the abolitionist movement. In conclusion (of his own journal and of the book), Ewing writes that history is governed by the results of vicious and virtuous acts precipitated by belief: wherefore "a purely predatory world shall consume itself" and "The devil take the hindmost until the foremost is the hindmost", and imagines his father-in-law's response to his becoming an abolitionist, as a warning that Adam's life would amount to one drop in a limitless ocean; whereas Ewing's proposed reply is: "Yet what is any ocean but a multitude of drops?"

Reception
Cloud Atlas received positive reviews from most critics, who felt that it managed to successfully interweave its six stories. The BBC's Keily Oakes said that although the book's structure could be challenging, "David Mitchell has taken six wildly different stories ... and melded them into one fantastic and complex work." Kirkus Reviews called it "sheer storytelling brilliance." Laura Miller of The New York Times compared it to the "perfect crossword puzzle," in that it was challenging to read but still fun. The Observers Hephzibah Anderson called it "exhilarating" and commented positively on the links between the stories. In a review for The Guardian, Booker Prize winner A. S. Byatt wrote that it gave "a complete narrative pleasure that is rare." The Washington Posts Jeff Turrentine called it "a highly satisfying, and unusually thoughtful, addition to the expanding 'puzzle book' genre." In its "Books Briefly Noted" section, The New Yorker called it "virtuosic." Marxist literary critic Fredric Jameson found its new, science fiction-inflected variation on the historical novel now "defined by its relation to future fully as much as to past." Richard Murphy said in the Review of Contemporary Fiction that Mitchell had taken core values from his previous novels and built upon them.

Criticism focused on the book's failure to meet its lofty goals. F&SF reviewer Robert K. J. Killheffer praised Mitchell's "talent and inventiveness and willingness to adopt any mode or voice that furthers his ends," but noted that "for all its pleasures, Cloud Atlas falls short of revolutionary." Theo Tait of The Daily Telegraph gave the novel a mixed review, focusing on its clashing themes, saying "it spends half its time wanting to be The Simpsons and the other half the Bible."

In 2019, Cloud Atlas was ranked 9th on The Guardian'''s list of the 100 best books of the 21st century.

In 2020, Bill Gates recommended it as part of his Summer Reading List.

Linking themes
Mitchell has said of the book:

Structure and style
In an interview, Mitchell said that the book's title was inspired by the music of the same name by Japanese composer Toshi Ichiyanagi: "I bought the CD just because of that track's beautiful title." Mitchell's previous novel, number9dream, was inspired by music by John Lennon. Both Ichiyanagi and Lennon were husbands of Yoko Ono, and Mitchell has said this fact "pleases me ... though I couldn't duplicate the pattern indefinitely."

The book's style was inspired by Italo Calvino's If on a winter's night a traveler, which contains several incomplete, interrupted narratives. Mitchell's innovation was to add a 'mirror' in the centre of his book so that each story could be brought to a conclusion.

Mitchell said that Vyvyan Ayrs and Robert Frobisher were inspired by English composer Frederick Delius and his amanuensis Eric Fenby. He has also noted the influence of Russell Hoban's novel Riddley Walker on the Sloosha's Crossin' story.

Textual variations
Academic Martin Paul Eve noticed significant differences in the American and British editions of the book while writing a paper on the book. He noted "an astonishing degree" of variance and that "one of the chapters was almost entirely rewritten". According to Mitchell, who authorized both editions, the differences emerged because the editor assigned to the book at its US publisher left their job, leaving the US version un-edited for a considerable period. Meanwhile Mitchell and his editor and copy editor in the UK continued to make changes to the manuscript. However, those changes were not passed on to the US publisher, and similarly, when a new editor was assigned to the book at the US publisher and made his own changes, Mitchell did not ask for those to be applied to the British edition, which was very close to being sent to press. Mitchell said: "Due to my inexperience at that stage in my three-book 'career', it hadn't occurred to me that having two versions of the same novel appearing on either side of the Atlantic raises thorny questions over which is definitive, so I didn't go to the trouble of making sure that the American changes were applied to the British version (which was entering production by that point probably) and vice versa."

Film adaptation

The novel was adapted to film by directors Tom Tykwer and the Wachowskis. With an ensemble cast to cover the multiple storylines, production began in September 2011 at Studio Babelsberg in Germany. The film was released in North America on 26 October 2012. In October 2012, Mitchell wrote an article in The Wall Street Journal called "Translating 'Cloud Atlas' Into the Language of Film" in which he compared the adapters' work to translating a work into another language.

References

Further reading
 Dillon, S. ed. (2011) David Mitchell: Critical Essays (Kent: Gylphi) 
 Eve, Martin Paul. "Close Reading with Computers: Genre Signals, Parts of Speech, and David Mitchell’s Cloud Atlas." SubStance 46, no. 3 (2017): 76-104.

External links

 David Mitchell discusses Cloud Atlas on the BBC's The Culture Show
 Cloud Atlas at complete review'' (summary of reviews)
 Cloud Atlas by David Mitchell , review by Ted Gioia (Conceptual Fiction)

2004 British novels
British Book Award-winning works
2004 science fiction novels
Fiction set in 1850
Fiction set in 1931
Fiction set in 1975
Novels set in the 22nd century
Novels set in the 24th century
British science fiction novels
British novels adapted into films
Novels about cannibalism
Novels about cloning
Dystopian novels
Epistolary novels
Frame stories
British post-apocalyptic novels
Books written in fictional dialects
Male bisexuality in fiction
Novels by David Mitchell
Metafictional novels
Novels set in Belgium
Bruges in fiction
Novels set in California
Novels set in England
Novels set in Korea
Novels set in Hawaii
Novels set on islands
Novels about reincarnation
Sceptre (imprint) books
Novels set in New Zealand
Chatham Islands
Science fiction novels adapted into films
Nonlinear narrative novels
Novels with bisexual themes
LGBT speculative fiction novels
Future dialects